Major Sir George Cumine Strahan  (9 December 1838 – 17 February 1887) was a British military officer and colonial administrator, best known as the Governor of Tasmania from 1881 to 1886.

Early life and military career
Strahan was born on 9 December 1838 in Fraserburgh, Aberdeenshire, Scotland, in the United Kingdom. After graduating from the Royal Military Academy, Woolwich, he joined the Royal Artillery corps of the British Army as a lieutenant in 1857.

Colonial career
Strahan was assigned as aide-de-camp to the last two Lord High Commissioners of the Ionian Islands: William Ewart Gladstone (actually High Commissioner Extraordinary, later to become Prime Minister) and Sir Henry Storks. When Storks was appointed Governor of Malta in 1864, Strahan accompanied him and served his successor, Sir Patrick Grant, until 1868 when he was made chief secretary of Malta. Further administrative appointments in various capacities followed in the Bahamas (colonial secretary 1868–1872, acting governor 1872–1873), Lagos Colony (administrator 1873–1874), Gold Coast (governor 1874–1876) and the Windward Islands/Barbados (governor 1876–1880).

Governor of Tasmania
Strahan was appointed Governor of Tasmania in April 1880, and was knighted shortly after. He did not, however, take up the appointment until arriving in Hobart in December 1881. The long delay was caused by Strahan acting as administrator of the Cape Colony and high commissioner to Southern Africa until the arrival of Sir Hercules Robinson.

Strahan was a popular governor in Tasmania, regarded as attentive to education, health and rural industry. His own health was occasionally questioned, and the spells of illness he suffered during his term were put down to having spent so many years in the tropical climates of the Caribbean and Africa.

Strahan left Tasmania in October 1886, and returned to England via Melbourne. He was appointed as Governor of Hong Kong to replace Sir George Bowen, but died in Bournemouth on 17 February 1887 before he could take up the appointment.

Legacy
The town of Strahan on the West Coast of Tasmania was named after George Strahan in 1892.

References
Neil Smith, 'Strahan, Sir George Cumine (1838–1887)', Australian Dictionary of Biography, Volume 6, Melbourne University Press, 1976, pp. 203–204.

1838 births
1887 deaths
Colonial Administrative Service officers
Royal Artillery officers
Governors of Barbados
Governors of the Cape Colony
Governors of Tasmania
Governors of the Windward Islands
Knights Commander of the Order of St Michael and St George
Graduates of the Royal Military Academy, Woolwich
British governors of the Bahamas
People from Fraserburgh
Colony of Tasmania people
Colonial Secretaries of the Bahamas